George Nisbet was a professional footballer who played 104 games for Lincoln City, including 62 appearances in the Football League. He played as a centre half or left half.

Playing career
Nisbet played for Maxwelltown Volunteers in Scotland before joining Lincoln City in August 1906 along with teammates George Kennedy and Norrie Fairgray. He went straight into the starting eleven for the opening game of the season, on 1 September in a 4–3 away win at Burton United in the Football League Second Division, and played regularly through that season. He appeared in 26 games in 1907–08, at the end of which Lincoln failed to be re-elected to the Football League. He again played regularly in 1908–09, contributing to Lincoln winning the Midland League title, after which they were re-elected to the Football League. Nisbet played his last competitive game for the club exactly three years after his debut, in a 5–0 defeat at Leeds City.

Notes

References

Association football defenders
Association football wing halves
Lincoln City F.C. players
English Football League players
Midland Football League players
Year of birth missing
Place of birth missing
Year of death missing
Place of death missing
English footballers